Athletics competitions at the 1973 Central American Games were held at the Estadio Nacional Mateo Flores in Guatemala City, Guatemala, in November 1973.

A total of 38 events were contested, 24 by men and 14 by women.

Medal summary

Gold medal winners and their results were published.  A complete list of medal winners can be found on the MásGoles webpage
(click on "JUEGOS CENTROAMERICANOS" in the low right corner).  Gold medalists were also published in other sources.  A couple of results can be found in the archives of Costa Rican newspaper La Nación.

All results are marked as "affected by altitude" (A), because Ciudad de
Guatemale is located at 1,592 m above sea level.

Men

Women

Notes
*: Original model javelin.

Medal table (unofficial)

References

Athletics at the Central American Games
International athletics competitions hosted by Guatemala
Central American Games
1973 in Guatemalan sport